Kay Long (24 September 1920 – 27 December 2007) was a British athlete. She competed in the women's javelin throw at the 1948 Summer Olympics.

References

1920 births
2007 deaths
Athletes (track and field) at the 1948 Summer Olympics
British female javelin throwers
Olympic athletes of Great Britain
People from Kingston upon Thames